The Peru blind snake (Epictia peruviana) is a species of snake in the family Leptotyphlopidae.

References

Epictia
Snakes of South America
Reptiles of Peru
Reptiles described in 1969